
IET can refer to:

Organizations

 Institute of Educational Technology, part of the Open University
 Institution of Engineering and Technology, a UK-based professional engineering institution
 Institute of Engineers and Technicians, which became part of the Institution of Incorporated Engineers in 1998 (which then became part of the Institution of Engineering and Technology in 2006)
 Institute of Engineering and Technology of Lucknow, India
 University Institute of Engineering and Technology, Kanpur University of Kanpur, India, formerly known as IET Kanpur
 Institute of Engineering Technology, Sri Lanka, a Government higher education institute that providing NDES (National Diploma in Engineering Sciences) Award in Sri Lanka
 IET Bhaddal, an engineering institute based in Bhaddal, Punjab
Islamic Educational Trust, Islamic organization in Nigeria
 Institute of Engineering and Technology, Ayodhya of Faizabad, Uttar Pradesh, India

Persons 

 iET (musician), a singer-songwriter from the Netherlands

Processes 

 Impulse excitation technique
 Initial Entry Training, the technical term for United States Army Basic Training
 Interval exchange transformation
 Interest Equalization Tax, an American tax initiative

Other 

 British Rail Class 800, British high-speed trains, known as Intercity Express Trains by their operator Great Western Railway
 Indole-3-ethanol or tryptophol, a chemical compound